Adolph Christian Ernest von Ernsthausen (17 October 1880 – 29 May 1928) was an English first-class cricketer active 1900–04 who played for Surrey and Oxford University. He was born in Hampstead; died in Surrey.

References

1880 births
1928 deaths
English cricketers
Surrey cricketers
Oxford University cricketers
People educated at Uppingham School
Alumni of Balliol College, Oxford